The Tachikawa Ki-70 "Clara" was a high speed photo reconnaissance aircraft that was tested for the Japanese Air Force in prototype form but never entered production. The Ki-70 was the intended successor to the Mitsubishi Ki-46 but was difficult to handle and was slower than the Mitsubishi Ki-46. The Ki-70 was first flown in 1943 but was found unsatisfactory and the program was terminated. Three aircraft were built.

History 

In later years the Ki-70 was used to disprove supposed photographic evidence concerning Amelia Earhart's supposed capture by the Japanese before World War II.

Description 
Using the familiar layout of aircraft such as the Mitsubishi G3M bomber and its planned predecessor the Mitsubishi Ki-46, the Ki-70 had a twin tail and narrow fuselage, an extensively glazed nose and second cockpit facing aft for the gunner.

Specifications (Ha-104M engine)
(Performance estimated)

See also

References

Notes

Bibliography

 Francillon, Réne J. Japanese Aircraft of the Pacific War. London: Putnam, 1970. .
 Francillon, René J. Japanese Aircraft of the Pacific War. London: Putnam Aeronautical, 1979. . (new edition 1987. .)

External links 
  Complete specifications for the Ki-70

Ki-70
1940s Japanese military reconnaissance aircraft
Aircraft first flown in 1943
Twin piston-engined tractor aircraft